Por Tor Thor Petchrungruang (ป.ต.ท. เพชรรุ่งเรือง), also known as PTT Petchrungruang (ปตท. เพชรรุ่งเรือง), is a Thai Muay Thai fighter. He currently competes for the THAI FIGHT promotion.

Biography
PTT started training in Muay Thai at the age of nine at the Petchrungruang camp in the Chonburi Province. He followed boxers during their training, which led him to a gym where the owners were willing to train PTT and other kids for free. He had his first fight a few months later. It took two years before he received his first purses, which he used to support his family. He made his debut in Bangkok at the age of 13 and soon had to take on adults due to his large build.
On November 24, 2012 PTT won his first major title when he defeated Nataphon Kiatawan for the Omnoi Stadium 130 lbs title.

In 2015, PTT engaged in the annual Isuzu Cup, where he went undefeated, winning the title on February 17, 2016, against Diesellek Aoodonmuang. This win allowed him to compete at THAI FIGHT Korat on March 19, 2016, against Payaksamui Lukjaoporongtom. He won by decision and was rewarded with a multi-fight contract for the THAI FIGHT promotion.

On December 24, 2016, PTT defeated Sean Kearney from Canada to win the THAI FIGHT King's Cup 67 kg title.

On January 27, 2018, PTT won the THAI FIGHT Kard Chuek King's Cup at 70 kg by defeating Dany Njiba by knockout in the first round.

On October 27, 2017, PPT saw his 19 fights win streak in THAI FIGHT end when Brazilian fighter Diego Beneduzzi knocked him out in the first round at THAI FIGHT Chiangrai 2018.

Titles and accomplishments
Omnoi Stadium
 2012 Omnoi Stadium 130 lbs Champion
 2016 Isuzu Cup Winner
THAI FIGHT
 2016 Isuzu Cup -67 kg Superfight Winner
 2016 Thai Fight -67 kg King's Cup Champion
 2018 Thai Fight -70 kg Kard Chuek King's Cup Champion
 2019 Thai Fight -69 kg Superfight Champion

Fight record

|-  style="background:#cfc;"
| 2023-02-26|| Win ||align=left| Award ChokdeeGym || Thai Fight KonlakPathum || Pathum Thani province, Thailand || TKO (punches) || 1 || 

|- style="background:#cfc;"
| 2023-02-04 ||Win || align="left" | Adriano Oliveira || THAI FIGHT Luang Phor Ruay|| Saraburi province, Thailand ||  KO (Punches)|| 1 ||
|- style="background:#cfc;"
| 2022-12-24|| Win || align="left" | Omar Mahir|| Thai Fight: Metropolitan Police Bureau 100th Anniversary || Bangkok, Thailand || KO (Punches) || 1 || 
|- style="background:#CCFFCC;"
| 2022-11-20|| Win || align="left" | Expedito Valin|| THAI FIGHT Vana Nava Hua Hin || Hua Hin district, Thailand || KO (Punches) || 1 || 
|- style="background:#cfc;"
| 2022-10-16|| Win|| align="left" | Thun Chantak || THAI FIGHT Vajiravudh || Bangkok, Thailand || KO (Punches)||1  || 
|- style="background:#cfc;"
| 2022-06-26|| Win || align="left" | Cristian Pastore|| THAI FIGHT Sisaket|| Sisaket province, Thailand || KO || 1 || 
|- style="background:#cfc;"
| 2022-05-29|| Win|| align="left" | Mojtaba Talebi || THAI FIGHT Nakhon Sawan || Nakhon Sawan province, Thailand || KO (Straight to the body)  || 1 || 
|- style="background:#CCFFCC;"
| 2022-05-08|| Win || align="left" | Luiz Alves|| THAI FIGHT Sung Noen || Sung Noen district, Thailand || KO (Punches) || 1 ||
|- style="background:#cfc;"
| 2022-04-17|| Win || align="left" | Hamed Soleimani|| THAI FIGHT KonlakPathum || , Thailand || TKO (Punches)  || 1 || 
|- style="background:#cfc;"
| 2022-03-20|| Win || align="left" | Dylan Ofleidi || THAI FIGHT Lampang || Lampang, Thailand || KO (Elbow) || 2 ||

|- style="background:#cfc;"
| 2021-12-19|| Win || align="left" | Amrane Iskounen || THAI FIGHT Khao Aor || Phatthalung, Thailand || TKO || 1 ||

|-  style="background:#CCFFCC;"
| 2021-07-04|| Win ||align=left| Fabio Reis || THAI FIGHT Strong || Pattaya, Thailand || Decision || 3 || 3:00

|- style="background:#cfc;"
| 2021-04-25|| Win || align="left" | William Whipple || THAI FIGHT DMHTT || Samut Sakhon, Thailand || TKO (Doctor Stoppage)|| 1 ||

|- style="background:#cfc;"
| 2021-04-03|| Win || align="left" | Alexandru Bublea|| THAI FIGHT Nan || Nan province, Thailand || Decision  || 3 || 3:00

|- style="background:#cfc;" 
| 2020-11-28|| Win || align="left" | Braian Allevato|| THAI FIGHT Pluak Daeng || Rayong, Thailand || KO (Uppercut) || 1 ||

|- style="background:#cfc;"
| 2020-11-07|| Win || align="left" | Sliman Zegnoun || THAI FIGHT Korat 2020 || Nakhon Ratchasima, Thailand || KO (Right Cross)|| 1 ||

|- style="background:#cfc;"
| 2020-10-17|| Win || align="left" | Vladimir Oparin || Thai Fight Begins || Nonthaburi, Thailand || KO (Right Cross)|| 1 ||

|- style="background:#cfc;"
| 2020-09-19|| Win || align="left" | Parmit Grover|| THAI FIGHT: New Normal|| Bangkok, Thailand || KO (Elbows & punches) || 1 ||

|- style="background:#cfc;"
| 2019-12-21|| Win || align="left" | Kofi Tuakama|| THAI FIGHT: Thai Fest in Patong || Phuket, Thailand || TKO (Punches) || 1 ||

|- style="background:#cfc;"
| 2019-10-26|| Win || align="left" | Muhammad Khalil || THAI FIGHT Bangsaen || Chonburi, Thailand || KO (Right elbow) || 1 ||

|- style="background:#cfc;"
| 2019-08-24|| Win || align="left" | Mohammad Saisarani|| THAI FIGHT Kham Chanod || Udon Thani, Thailand || TKO (Punches & knees) || 1 ||

|- style="background:#cfc;"
| 2019-06-29|| Win || align="left" | Nima Vakili|| THAI FIGHT Betong || Betong, Thailand || TKO (Punches) || 2 ||

|- style="background:#cfc;"
| 2019-03-30|| Win || align="left" | Luca Lombardo || THAI FIGHT Mueang Khon || Nakhon Si Thammarat, Thailand || TKO (Punches) || 2 ||

|- style="background:#cfc;"
| 2019-02-23|| Win || align="left" | Jason Polydor || THAI FIGHT Phuket || Phuket, Thailand || KO (Punches & knee)|| 1||

|- style="background:#cfc;
| 2018-12-22|| Win || align="left" | Farhad Mandomi || THAI FIGHT Nakhon Ratchasima || Nakhon Ratchasima, Thailand || KO (Right Cross) || 1 ||

|- style="background:#fbb;"
| 2018-10-27|| Loss || align="left" | Diego Beneduzzi || THAI FIGHT Chiangrai 2018 || Chiang Rai, Thailand || KO (Overhand Right) || 1 ||

|- style="background:#cfc;"
| 2018-08-25|| Win || align="left" | Yan Naing Aung || THAI FIGHT Rayong || Rayong, Thailand || KO (Punches) || 1 ||

|- style="background:#cfc;"
| 2018-07-07|| Win || align="left" | Tun Naing Oo || THAI FIGHT Hat Yai || Hat Yai, Thailand || KO (Low Kick) || 1 ||

|-  style="background:#cfc;"
| 2018-05-12|| Win ||align=left| Walid Otmane || THAI FIGHT Samui  ||  Ko Samui, Thailand || KO (Right Cross)|| 1 ||

|- style="background:#cfc;"
| 2018-04-21|| Win || align="left" | Samed Memaj || THAI FIGHT Rome|| Rome, Italy || Decision || 3 || 3:00

|-  style="background:#cfc;"
| 2018-03-24|| Win || align="left" | Cleber Moraes || THAI FIGHT Mueang Khon 2018 || Nakhon Si Thammarat, Thailand || TKO (Punches) || 1 ||

|-  style="background:#cfc;"
| 2018-01-27|| Win ||align=left| Dany Njiba || THAI FIGHT Bangkok || Bangkok, Thailand || KO (Right Cross) || 1 ||
|-
! style=background:white colspan=9 |

|-  style="background:#cfc;"
| 2017-12-23|| Win ||align=left| Victor Nunes|| THAI FIGHT Chiang Mai || Chiang Mai, Thailand || KO (Right Cross) || 1 ||

|-  style="background:#cfc;"
| 2017-11-25|| Win ||align=left|  Gokhan Boran || KHMER - THAI FIGHT || Phnom Penh, Cambodia || Decision || 3 || 3:00

|-  style="background:#cfc;"
| 2017-09-30|| Win ||align=left| Jesus Romero || THAI FIGHT Barcelona || Barcelona, Spain || Decision || 3 || 3:00

|-  style="background:#cfc;"
| 2017-07-15|| Win ||align=left| Stephen Oppong || THAI FIGHT: We Love Yala || Thailand || KO (Right elbow)|| 1 ||

|-  style="background:#cfc;"
| 2017-05-27|| Win ||align=left| Christian Zahe || THAI FIGHT Italy || Turin, Italy || TKO (Right elbow)|| 1 ||

|-  style="background:#cfc;"
| 2017-04-29|| Win ||align=left| Jarred Rothwell || THAI FIGHT Samui 2017 || Ko Samui, Thailand || KO (Right Cross)|| 1 ||

|-  style="background:#cfc;"
| 2017-04-08|| Win ||align=left| Charles François || THAI FIGHT Paris || Paris, France || Decision || 3 || 3:00

|-  style="background:#cfc;"
| 2016-12-24|| Win ||align=left| Sean Kearney || THAI FIGHT The Fighter King || Thailand || KO (Low kick)|| 1 || 
|-
! style=background:white colspan=9 |

|-  style="background:#cfc;"
| 2016-11-19|| Win ||align=left| Marc Rey || THAI FIGHT AIR RACE 1 || Thailand || KO (Right Elbow) || 1 ||

|-  style="background:#cfc;"
| 2016-10-15|| Win ||align=left| Christ Axelsson || THAI FIGHT Chengdu || Chengdu, China || Decision || 3 || 3:00

|-  style="background:#cfc;"
| 2016-08-20|| Win ||align=left| Keivan Soleimani || THAI FIGHT KMITL || Thailand || Decision || 3 || 3:00

|-  style="background:#cfc;"
| 2016-07-23|| Win ||align=left| Dmitrii Mordvinov || THAI FIGHT Proud to Be Thai || Thailand || KO (Left elbow) || 3 ||

|-  style="background:#cfc;"
| 2016-04-30|| Win ||align=left| Craig Dickson || THAI FIGHT Samui 2016 || Ko Samui, Thailand || Decision || 3 || 3:00

|-  style="background:#cfc;"
| 2016-03-19|| Win ||align=left| Payaksamui Lukjaoporongtom || THAI FIGHT Korat - Isuzu Cup Superfight || Korat, Thailand || Decision || 3 || 3:00

|-  style="background:#cfc;"
| 2016-02-27|| Win||align=left| Diesellek Aoodonmuang  || Omnoi Stadium - Isuzu Cup Final ||  Samut Sakhon, Thailand || Decision || 5 ||3:00
|-
! style=background:white colspan=9 |

|-  style="background:#cfc;"
| 2015-12-19|| Win ||align=left| Saenguthai Sor.Jor.Piek-Uthai || Omnoi Stadium - Isuzu Cup Semi Final||  Samut Sakhon, Thailand || Decision || 5 ||3:00

|-  style="background:#cfc;"
| 2015-10-17|| Win ||align=left| Teded Sor.Serphet  ||Omnoi Stadium - Isuzu Cup ||  Samut Sakhon, Thailand || KO || 3 ||

|-  style="background:#cfc;"
| 2015-09-12|| Win ||align=left| Diesellek Aoodonmuang || Omnoi Stadium - Isuzu Cup||  Samut Sakhon, Thailand || Decision || 5 ||3:00

|-  style="background:#cfc;"
| 2015-08-22 || Win||align=left| Sorgraw Petchyindee Academy || Omnoi Stadium - Isuzu Cup || Samut Sakhon, Thailand || Decision || 5 || 3:00

|-  style="background:#fbb;"
| 2015-07-29 || Loss ||align=left| Rittewada Sor.Nipapon ||  || Songkla, Thailand || Decision || 5 || 3:00

|-  style="background:#cfc;"
| 2015-06-20 || Win||align=left| Simanoot Sor.Sarinya ||  || Thailand || Decision || 5 || 3:00

|-  style="background:#cfc;"
| 2015-05-02 || Win||align=left| Saenguthai Sor.Jor.Piek-Uthai || JaoMuayThai, Omnoi Stadium || Samut Sakhon, Thailand || Decision || 5 || 3:00

|-  style="background:#cfc;"
| 2015-03-21 || Win||align=left| Theppabut Sit Ubon || JaoMuayThai, Omnoi Stadium || Samut Sakhon, Thailand || Decision || 5 || 3:00

|-  style="background:#fbb;"
| 2015-01-25 || Loss||align=left| Manasak Saklekmuangnon ||  Rajadamnern Stadium || Bangkok, Thailand || Decision || 5 || 3:00

|-  style="background:#cfc;"
| 2014-12-13 || Win||align=left| Chok Sagami || JaoMuayThai, Omnoi Stadium || Samut Sakhon, Thailand || Decision || 5 || 3:00

|-  style="background:#fbb;"
| 2014-09-25 || Loss||align=left| Yodlekpet Or. Pitisak ||  Rajadamnern Stadium || Bangkok, Thailand || Decision || 5 || 3:00

|-  style="background:#fbb;"
| 2014-07-22 || Loss||align=left| Mongkolchai Phetsupapan || Phetsupapan || Thailand || KO || 2 ||

|-  style="background:#c5d2ea;"
| 2014-04-25 || Draw||align=left| Saengtawan Aor Talaybangsaray || Phetsupapan, Lumpinee Stadium ||Bangkok, Thailand || Decision || 5 || 3:00

|-  style="background:#cfc;"
| 2014-01-24 || Win||align=left| Nataphon Kiatawan || Weerapon, Lumpinee Stadium ||Bangkok, Thailand || Decision || 5 || 3:00

|-  style="background:#cfc;"
| 2013-11-22 || Win||align=left| Petchsuvarnabhumi Por.Nipapon || Phetsupaphan, Lumpinee Stadium ||Bangkok, Thailand || Decision || 5 || 3:00

|-  style="background:#fbb;"
| 2013-10-08 || Loss||align=left| Denpanom Ror.Kilacorath || Phetsupaphan, Lumpinee Stadium || Bangkok, Thailand || Decision || 5 || 3:00

|-  style="background:#cfc;"
| 2013-09-07 || Win||align=left| Chujaroen Dabransarakarm || JaoMuayThai, Omnoi Stadium || Samut Sakhon, Thailand || Decision || 5 || 3:00

|-  style="background:#fbb;"
| 2013-07-13|| Loss ||align=left| Chaosuanoi Petsupapan || Omnoi Stadium ||Samut Sakhon, Thailand || Decision || 5 || 3:00

|-  style="background:#cfc;"
| 2013-05-18|| Win||align=left| Liamphet Sitboonmee || Omnoi Stadium ||Samut Sakhon, Thailand || Decision || 5 || 3:00

|-  style="background:#cfc;"
| 2013-03-30 || Win ||align=left| Kaiwanlek Tor.Laksong || JaoMuayThai, Omnoi Stadium ||Samut Sakhon, Thailand || Decision || 5 || 3:00

|-  style="background:#fbb;"
| 2013-01-11 || Loss ||align=left| Nataphon Kiatawan || Phetsupapan, Lumpinee Stadium ||Bangkok, Thailand || TKO (Elbow) || 3 ||

|-  style="background:#cfc;"
| 2012-11-24|| Win||align=left| Nataphon Kiatawan || Omnoi Stadium ||Samut Sakhon, Thailand || Decision || 5 || 3:00 
|-
! style=background:white colspan=9 |

|-  style="background:#cfc;"
| 2012-09-01|| Win||align=left| Petchdam kilaKorat || Lumpinee Stadium ||Bangkok, Thailand || KO || 4 ||

|-  style="background:#cfc;"
| 2012-07-07|| Win||align=left| Chaimongkol Petsupapan || Lumpinee Stadium ||Bangkok, Thailand || Decision || 5 || 3:00

|-  style="background:#cfc;"
| 2012-05-26|| Win||align=left| Yodsiam Petsupapan || Lumpinee Stadium ||Bangkok, Thailand || Decision || 5 || 3:00

|-  style="background:#cfc;"
| 2012-03-24|| Win||align=left| Yodsiam Petsupapan || Lumpinee Stadium ||Bangkok, Thailand || Decision || 5 || 3:00

|-  style="background:#cfc;"
| 2012-02-25|| Win||align=left| Meknamchai Sor.Suriya || Omnoi Stadium ||Samut Sakhon, Thailand || Decision || 5 || 3:00 
|-
| colspan=9 | Legend:

References

1996 births
Por Tor Thor Petchrungruang
Living people
Por Tor Thor Petchrungruang